The 1953  New South Wales  state election  was held on 14 February 1953. The election was for all of the 94 seats in the  Legislative Assembly.

Issues
In February 1953, the ALP had been in power for 12 years and James McGirr, who had led the party to a near defeat in 1950, had lost the premiership to Joe Cahill 10 months earlier. McGirr's period as the Labor leader had been marked by policy indecisiveness, budget overspending and internal conflict. Cahill, by contrast, had won popular support as a vigorous and impressive minister who had resolved problems with New South Wales' electricity supply. During his first 10 months as premier, he  had reinvigorated the party. He appeared decisive and brought order to the government's chaotic public works program. In addition, he astutely attacked the increasingly unpopular federal Coalition  government of Robert Menzies.

By contrast, the Liberal Party and Country Party coalition led by Vernon Treatt  and Michael Bruxner was racked with internal divisions. Treatt himself, despite having been opposition leader for seven years, remained little known to the public. Whereas in 1950 his coalition had achieved a big swing against the ALP, in 1953 he was unable to convince voters that he possessed a coherent alternative policy to the government.

Key dates

Results

The result of the election was a landslide victory for Labor. Labor's vote was particularly strong in the Western and Southern suburbs of Sydney. It won the seats of Concord, Coogee, Drummoyne, Kogarah, Parramatta, Ryde and Sutherland from the Liberal Party and picked up the new suburban seats of East Hills and Fairfield. Labor's vote was resurgent in rural New South Wales where it won the seats of Armidale, Dubbo and Mudgee from the Country party. Labor also picked up the seat of North Sydney from Independent member James Geraghty who was the last of the 4 Independent members of parliament who had been expelled from the Labor party for disloyalty during an indirect election of the Legislative Council in 1949. John Seiffert, another rebel from 1949 and the member for Monaro, had been readmitted to the party in 1950 and retained the seat at this election, giving a further boost to Labor's numbers. Labor's losses included Ashfield which had been won from the Liberal Party at the 1952 by-election and Hartley which was retained by Jim Chalmers who stood as an Independent Labor candidate after he resigned from the party over a pre-selection dispute. The Minister for Labour, Industry and Social Welfare, Frank Finnan was unseated when his electorate of Darlinghurst was abolished, he lost a preselection contest for Concord, and he failed in an attempt to win Albury.

{{Australian elections/Title row
| table style = float:right;clear:right;margin-left:1em;
| title        = New South Wales state election, 14 February 1953
| house        = Legislative Assembly
| series       = New South Wales state election
| back         = 1950
| forward      = 1956
| enrolled     = 1,953,953
| total_votes  = 1,548,877
| turnout %    = 93.86
| turnout chg  = +1.11
| informal     = 39,416
| informal %   = 2.48
| informal chg = +0.71
}}

|}

Retiring members

Seats changing party representation

Aftermath
Joe Cahill's triumph at this election ensured that he remained premier during the course of the parliament. Treatt faced increasing opposition within the Liberal Party and was replaced as Leader of the Opposition by Murray Robson in August 1954. Bruxner continued as the Leader of the Country Party, a position he had held since 1932. During the parliament there were 7 by-elections with no change of party representation except for Kahibah where an Independent Labor candidate Tom Armstrong defeated the endorsed Labor candidate.

See also
Candidates of the 1953 New South Wales state election
Members of the New South Wales Legislative Assembly, 1953–1956

Notes

References

Elections in New South Wales
1953 elections in Australia
1950s in New South Wales
February 1953 events in Australia